The half-stripe bromeliad frog or Shreve's robber frog (Eleutherodactylus heminota) is a species of frog in the family Eleutherodactylidae endemic to Hispaniola and found in both the Dominican Republic and Haiti. Its natural habitats are subtropical or tropical moist lowland forest and subtropical or tropical moist montane forest.
It is threatened by habitat loss.

References

heminota
Endemic fauna of Hispaniola
Amphibians of the Dominican Republic
Amphibians of Haiti
Amphibians described in 1963
Taxonomy articles created by Polbot
Taxa named by Benjamin Shreve